Filatima golovina is a moth of the family Gelechiidae. It is found in North America, where it has been recorded from California and New Mexico.

The wingspan is 18–20 mm. The forewings are sordid white, overlaid by fuscous and other markings and ochreous scaling from the base, inside the costa, to and including the apex, gradually broadening to include nearly the whole apical third of the wing. There is a white spot on the costa and another on the tornus, indicating an obsolete transverse fascia. The discal spots are generally ill-defined or absent. The hindwings shining are greyish fuscous basally shading to fuscous around the margins.

References 

Moths described in 1947
Filatima